George Hardie (born 1873) was an English professional footballer who played as a goalkeeper.

References

1873 births
People from the Borough of Erewash
Footballers from Derbyshire
English footballers
Association football goalkeepers
West Hallam F.C. players
Denaby Wanderers F.C. players
Conisbrough F.C. players
Mexborough F.C. players
Grimsby Town F.C. players
Lincoln City F.C. players
English Football League players
Year of death missing